The St Kilda railway line is a former railway line in Melbourne, Australia.

Operation
The line was opened by the Melbourne and Hobson's Bay Railway Company in 1857. It ran for 4.5 kilometres from the Melbourne (or City) Terminus (on the site of modern-day Flinders Street station), crossing the Yarra River via the Sandridge Bridge, to branch off from the Port Melbourne line and after stopping at three stations along the line –  South Melbourne, Albert Park, Middle Park – ending at St Kilda.

For a short time early in the line's history, there was a short connection provided to the then Brighton line at Windsor, however this link was removed shortly after the direct link was provided to Bay Street from Richmond. The line was taken over by the Government of Victoria in 1878, to become part of Victorian Railways. The line was electrified in 1919.

Closure

The line was originally to be closed in 1981, and replaced with buses as recommended in the Lonie Report. Plans were sufficiently advanced for Melbourne-Brighton Bus Lines to have taken delivery of six Volgren bodied Volvo B10M buses before it was decided to retain the rail service after much opposition.

Along with the Port Melbourne line, the conversion of the line to light rail was first announced on 13 January 1983, by the Victorian state government. Cost estimates at the time was of around $6 million.

The line was officially closed on 31 July 1987, and reopened as part of the Melbourne tram network on 21 November 1987.

Melbourne tram route 96 now operates on the converted track. The section from Southbank Junction to St Kilda was converted to light rail, requiring the conversion from  broad gauge used by the Melbourne rail network to  tram track as well as reducing the overhead voltage from 1,500 V DC to 600 V DC required for the trams. The new tram route now continues down Fitzroy Street and the Esplanade to terminate at Acland Street.

Line guide

References

Closed Melbourne railway lines
5 ft 3 in gauge railways in Australia
Railway lines opened in 1857
Railway lines closed in 1987
1857 establishments in Australia
1987 disestablishments in Australia
Railway line